Naso or NASO may refer to:

Astronomical Societies 

 Nepal Astronomical Society (NASO)

Biology
Naso (fish), a genus of fishes
Catasetum naso, a species of orchid
Kurixalus naso, a species of frog
Parnara naso, a species of skipper butterfly

Other
Naso (surname)
Naso (people), also known as Teribe or Tjer-di, indigenous to Panama
Naso, Sicily, a town in the province of Messina, Sicily
Naso (parsha), in the annual Jewish cycle of Torah reading

NASO
NASO, a U.S. Naval Aviation Supply Officer, a warfare qualification device in the Navy Supply Corps
 National Adult School Organisation (NASO) in the United Kingdom

See also
Nasal (disambiguation)

National socialism